Zacorisca helictocestum is a species of moth of the family Tortricidae first described by Józef Razowski in 2013. It is found on Seram Island of Indonesia. The habitat consists of lower montane forests.

The wingspan is about 32 mm. The forewings are white in the distal third, mixed with ochreous forming a blotch in the basal half of the wing. There is a broader postmedian blotch and a transverse terminal patch. The remaining area is black. The hindwings are pale brownish orange with two concolorous spots at the termen.

Etymology
The specific name refers to the shape of the cestum and is derived from Greek helictos (meaning coiled).

References

Moths described in 2013
Zacorisca